John Freund may refer to:

 John Christian Freund (1848–1924), co-publisher of The Music Trades magazine
 John E. Freund (1921–2004), author of university level textbooks on statistics
 John F. Freund (1918–2001), U.S. Army general